The Hamilton Harbour Police, formed in 1921, was a police force providing policing services for the Hamilton Harbour Commission in Hamilton, Ontario, Canada from 1921 to 1986. 

These Special Constables patrolled Hamilton Harbour and Commission property. Members were trained by the Ontario Police College.

The force was disbanded in 1986.  The Hamilton-Wentworth Regional Police, now the Hamilton Police Service, took over the water policing duties, while general patrolling of Commission property went to contracted security.

References

Law enforcement agencies of Ontario
Organizations based in Hamilton, Ontario